La Plaine is a village in Switzerland forming part of the commune of Dardagny in the canton of Geneva.  On the right bank of the Rhône, it is the site of a perfume factory belonging to the Firmenich group.

Transport 
 La Plaine is the terminus station of Swiss Federal Railways' Rhône Express Regional service which runs twice hourly to Geneva.  It is part of the Geneva public transport Unireso fare network.
 La Plaine is also served by the X and T bus lines

Gallery

External links 

  website of Transports Publics Genevois.

Geography of the canton of Geneva